The Vaularon is a small river in southern Île-de-France (France), left tributary of the Yvette, in Bures-sur-Yvette, which is a tributary of the Orge and then the Seine. Its source is in Gometz-le-Chatel, in the Essonne department.

References

Rivers of France
Rivers of Essonne
Rivers of Île-de-France